Flatwoods (also Flat Woods or Flatwoods Junction, formerly Whitaker's Bluff) is an unincorporated community in Perry County, Tennessee, United States. Originally known as Whitaker's Bluff, the name was changed to Flatwoods in 1871.  It lies along State Route 13 south of the town of Linden, the county seat of Perry County.  Its elevation is 676 feet (206 m).

The Dr. Richard Calvin Bromley House or Bromley Hotel in Flatwoods is listed on the National Register of Historic Places. Built between 1909 and 1911, it housed the residence and medical office of Dr. Richard Bromley, and was later enlarged to provide accommodations for hunters and other travelers.

References

Unincorporated communities in Perry County, Tennessee
Unincorporated communities in Tennessee